The 2020 NCAA Division I Field Hockey Championship was the 40th annual tournament organized by the NCAA, to determine the national champion of Division I women's college field hockey in the United States. 

The semifinals and championship match were scheduled to be played at LR Hill Sport Complex at Old Dominion University in Norfolk, Virginia from November 20 to 22, 2020, however, the tournament was postponed due to the COVID-19 pandemic. The semifinals and championship match was held from May 7 to 9, 2021 at Karen Shelton Stadium at the University of North Carolina in Chapel Hill, North Carolina.

Qualified teams
 A total of 12 teams qualified for the 2020 tournament. Nine teams received automatic bids by winning their conference tournaments and an additional three teams earned at-large bids based on their regular season records.

Automatic qualifiers

At-large qualifiers

Bracket

See also 
NCAA Division II Field Hockey Championship
NCAA Division III Field Hockey Championship

References 

NCAA Division I Field Hockey Championship
NCAA Division I Field Hockey Championship
NCAA Division I Field Hockey Championship
NCAA Division I Field Hockey Championship